Malaysia competed in the 2006 Asian Games in Doha, Qatar. The country was represented by 244 athletes competing in 23 of the 39 sports provided. Among the popular sports were aquatics, athletics, badminton, bodybuilding, bowling, cycling, hockey, football, golf, gymnastics, kabaddi, karate-do, sepak takraw, squash, table tennis, taekwondo, weightlifting and wushu. Athletes from Malaysia won overall 42 medals (including eight golds), and clinched the eleventh spot in the medal table. Abdullah Sani Karim was the chief of the delegation.

Medal summary

Medals by sport

Multiple medalists
Malaysian competitors that have won at least two medals.

Medallists
The following Malaysian competitors won medals at the games; all dates are for December 2006.

Archery

Men's recurve

Women's recurve

Athletics

Roslinda Samsu won a silver in women's pole vault while Noraseela Mohd Khalid earned a bronze in the women's 400 metres hurdles.

Men
Track event

Field event

Women
Track event

Field events

Badminton

Malaysia's biggest hope, the second seed ranking in the world, Lee Chong Wei is looking forward for at least a gold. However, after losing to the third seed from Korea, Lee Hyun-il by 21-19, 21-19, the Malaysian badminton team 2 men's double were beaten by the Korean team. Malaysia won the bronze medal in the men's team, after losing to South Korea by 3-1.

In the individual section, Lee Chong Wei faced Taufik Hidayat in the semifinals and losing to 21-16, 21-18. Again, he got a  bronze medal only. However, Malaysia unseeded men's doubles pair of Koo Kien Kiat and Tan Boon Heong went all the way. After the  world no. 1 Chinese pair in the quarterfinal and World Champion Indonesian doubles Kido Markis and Setiawan Hendra, they again beat another Indonesian team in the final, winning a victory gold medal for Malaysia in the men's double. This was Malaysia's 1st gold medal in badminton for 36 years. Malaysia was even unable to progress to the final in Asian games; they lost to Indonesia 12 years ago.

Besides the men's singles and doubles, Malaysia also attained 2 bronze in the men's team event and also the mixed double.

Men's team
Pool C

Semifinal

Ranked 3rd in final standings

Women's team
Pool W

Bodybuilding

MBBF is banking on Sazali Samad, who recently won the gold in the bantamweight category of Mr. Universe held in the Czech Republic in October. Sazali recently did a training stint with coach Milos Sarcev in California recently, which proved good as he picked up the Mr. Universe title soon after.

However, in the 65 kg bodybuilding final, he was unable to catch another gold for Malaysia, but only earn a silver medal.

Men

Bowling

Esther Cheah realised her dream by winning a gold medal at the Asian Games, just as her father and Malaysian national coach Holloway Cheah had done in the men's team of five event back in 1978.

The 20-year-old became the first Malaysian to win the tenpin bowling women's singles with an Asian Games record of 1,444 for a six-game series and an average of 240.7.

“I trained her very hard for it,” Holloway Cheah said after his daughter's victory. “I leave everything with the Lord and I’m very proud for her. I knew that she could make it. It is the best Asian Games that I have attended in my life.”

Indonesia's Putty Insavilla Armein had to settle for silver – the first ever medal for her country in women's singles at the Asian Games – despite earlier breaking the eight-year-old record with a total of 1,395.

However Armein refused to be downhearted after the competition, paying tribute to Cheah instead: “I was not disappointed, she did better today. The battle of the day is over. My best today was not good enough to earn the gold.

“I didn’t know I had [set a then record], but I am feeling extremely happy that I did that. What I did today is my best performance in this event.”

Angkana Netrviseth claimed the bronze medal – an early present for her 17th birthday on 24 December – with a total of 1,331, three pins better than that of Japanese bowler Kanako Ishimine.

Esther Cheah also helped Malaysia win the women's team of five crown with a Games record 6,555 total for a six-game series, but had to settle for silver in the all events competition behind Choi Jin A of Korea on Friday 8 December.

The medals took Cheah's personal haul at Doha 2006 to two gold medals and two silver, the 20-year-old having already become the first Malaysian to win the women's singles and then claimed silver in the women's trios.

Cheah and teammates Sharon Koh Suet Len, Wendy Chai De Choo, Zandra Aziela and Shalin Zulkifli at the Qatar Bowling Centre to shatter the previous six-game record of 6,272 – set by Japan in Busan four years ago.

However this was not the only record the Malaysians claimed on the way to victory, posting new benchmarks for a one-game series and three-game series which had stood at 1,156 and 3,183 respectively.

Malaysia took gold by 239 pins from the Korean quintet of Choi, Hwang Sun Ok, Gang Hye Eun, Kim Yeau Jin and Nam Bo Ra – the latter two having won the gold medal in this event in 2002 – who scored 6,316.

"We are very happy after winning gold today for the team of five. We got second in the last game of trios and after that we set our target for gold only and we have done it [as] this time we beat the team of Korea," Cheah said.

The bronze medal went to Tan Bee Leng, Cherie Tan Shi Hua, Evelyn Chan Lu Ee, Michelle Kwang Tien Mei and Valerie Teo Hui Ying of Singapore with their total of 6,239 being 165 pins better than the Chinese team.

Choi, who led the Korean team by example with the top total of her compatriots, though had cause to smile after pipping Cheah to the all events gold medal with an average of 222.5.

A bowler's totals from the singles, doubles, trios and team of five competitions are added together to determine the all events champion, with Choi's total of 5,339 being not only 43 pins better than that of Cheah, but also a Games record.

This gave Choi her fourth medal of the Games like Cheah, the Korean having also won silver in the doubles and bronze in the trios earlier in the week. Teo also collected her third medal with the bronze on 5,245, the Singaporean having also won the doubles with Kwang.

Singles

Doubles

Trios

Team

All-events

Masters

Boxing

Three boxers represented Malaysia and competed for 11 gold medals at stake in this edition of the Asiad. The country garnered three bronze medals in boxing
at the 2005 Southeast Asian Games in the Philippines. The Busan 2002 Asian Games powerhouse countries include:  Uzbekistan, South Korea, Kazakhstan, Pakistan and Thailand.

Cue sports

Esther Kwan Suet Yee earned a silver in women 9 ball pool-singles.

Men

Women

Cycling

Road

Track
Sprint

Pursuit

Time trial

Points race

Keirin

Diving

Malaysian diver Elizabeth Jimie may only be 14 years old and have just two international appearances to her name, but she will be among the contenders to land a medal at the 15th Asian Games Doha 2006. 

Jimie is already a world champion after her victory on home soil in the Group B (14–15 years old) 1 m springboard event at the 16th World Youth Championships in Kuala Lumpur in August.

Jimie beat two Chinese divers to take that gold at the Federation Internationale de Natation (FINA) event, and become the first Malaysian female diver to win a world title – only a month after making her debut on the international stage at the World Cup in Changshu, China.

However Jimie, who comes from a family of four siblings in Kuching, is no stranger to the Malaysian scene. She was first drafted into the national squad as an 11-year-old, only to suffer from homesickness and return home to the state of Sarawak.

“I will be partnering Leong Mun Yee for the 3m synchronised event,” Jimie told The Star newspaper. “I will also compete in the 1m and 3m springboard individual events.

“It will be great to reach the final, but I want to concentrate on improving my diving skills.”

Malaysia has high hopes for her with Edwin Chong, the Amateur Swimming Union of Malaysia (ASUM) Secretary, admitting that “it is not beyond her abilities to win an Asian Games medal, especially in the 3m synchronised event”.

As a result, in the women's 3 m synchronised event held on 11 December, Malaysia team of Edwin Chong and Elizabeth Jimie won a bronze medal with a total point of 275.04 points, 50.40 points behind the gold medalist (the China diving team).

The next day, again Elizabeth Jimie got another bronze medal in the Women's 1 m Springboard Final, with 280.30 points. The other two Chinese girls got a gold and a silver. Another Malaysian, Leong Mun Yee, got 4th place in the game.

In the men's synchro 3 m springboard final, Malaysian representative of Roslan Rossharisham and Yeoh Ken Nee get a total result of 393.36, 55.14 points behind the china gold medallist and got another silver medal for Malaysia.

Yeoh Ken Nee, as Malaysia another medal prospect in the Men's 1m Springboard Final event, got a 4th place, with a difference of 19.35 points behind Japan's Terauchi Ken. Earlier in the preliminary round, Yeoh get a 3rd place, only slightly behind China's Luo and Qin.

Men

Women

Equestrian

A bronze each from dressage - individual and Eventing - Individual, while a silver from dressage - Team.

Dressage

Endurance

Eventing

Jumping

Field hockey

Men's tournament

The Malaysian men team shared the same group with Pakistan, Japan, Hong Kong and Chinese Taipei.

Women's tournament

Football

Men's tournament

Golf

Men

Gymnastics

Artistic
Ng Shu Wai had won a silver in men's vault.
Men

Women

Rhythmic
Women

Karate

The Karate event had begun on 12 December, but on the 1st day, Malaysia had already won 5 medals, including 4 silver and a bronze. Ramasamy Puvaneswaran, Lakanathan Kunasilan, Ku Jin Keat and Anthony Vasantha Marial won a silver in Men's Kumite -55 kg, Men's Kumite -60 kg, Men's individual Kata	and Women's Kumite -48 kg events respectively, while Lim Lee Lee won a bronze in the Women's individual Kata event.

Men

Women

Sailing

Unexpectedly, 15 years old Rufina Tan Hong Mui, who took part in the women's optimist event, won a gold for her country, winning the 1st medal in the sailing events of Malaysia, as well as the 1st gold medal in the Asian games since 1994. She had 30 points in total, 12 points higher than the silver winning Japanese competitor, Komiya Haruka.

In the Laser 4.7 Open, Malaysia's Nurul Elia Anuar also won a bronze with 47 points in total after 12 races.

Men

Women

Open

Sepaktakraw

In men's regu and men's team, Malaysian team went into final and lost to the Thailand teams, winning two silver for Malaysia. However, in the men's double, Malaysia was defeated by Myanmar and only manage to get a bronze.

Men

Shooting

Men

Women

Squash

Nicol Ann David will be an obvious gold medal hopeful, being her No.1 current world ranking. The Penangite is in top condition after winning the Hong Kong Open last month. With a disastrous outing at the Melbourne Commonwealth Games in March this year, Nicol can be expected to give her 200 per cent to bag the Asiad gold medal as an apology to the country.

Four Malaysian got themselves into the men's and women's individual semifinals. However, Sharon Wee Ee Lin was defeated by Hong Kong's Chiu Wing Yin with 9-6, 9-1, 9-3. However, the Nicol Ann David and the other two Malaysian men's squash player had given a place in the final. As a result, Malaysia is ensure to win at least 1 gold 2 silver.

Defending champion Ong Beng Hee of Malaysia beat compatriot and top seed Mohamad Azlan Iskandar to claim the gold medal in the men's singles squash final at Khalifa International Complex on Thursday.

In a closely fought encounter, which could have gone either way, Ong prevailed 5–9, 9–1,10–9, 9–5. Iskander began the stronger, winning a series of long rallies and he was good value for his first set win. But thereafter things went awry for the top seed and Ong began to dictate terms.

Iskandar used gamesmanship on several occasions, prompting a number of lets during the match, but he was unable to disturb the concentration of Ong. Indeed, it was Iskandar who cracked first, throwing his racket to the ground in the crucial third game, which Ong just edged.

With Nicol Ann David's comfortable victory in the women's singles earlier in the day, Malaysia cleaned up on the courts, much to the delight of their supporters.

After the game, Ong said, "We've both done well. There were Malaysian finalists in both events. There were also a lot of VIPs here tonight, I see a lot of relieved faces!

"It's good to win, you never know when you can win another Asian Games gold medal. I was very nervous, I think he was very nervous too. I was very lucky to win the third game 10-9. If Azlan had won the third game 10-9, then it might have been a different story.

"I didn't think I played very well, but this was a tough match against a tough opponent who can easily dominate the court. I tried to use my mobility to move my opponent around the court."

Iskandar said, "I just hit too many errors, made too many mistakes. It's not rocket science.

"I've been mentally tired. But the best athletes have to back it up every match. The objective is to win, simple."

As expected, World no 1 Nicol Ann David exorcised her demons of the last Asian Games, by winning gold in the women's squash singles at the Khalifa International Complex on Thursday, 14 December. Four years ago she suffered a devastating loss to Chiu Wing Yin at the final in Busan, Korea which caused her to take a four-month break from the game to reassess her career in the sport. But this time round it was a whole different story as she brushed aside her rival from Hong Kong, China 9–0, 9–3, 9–3 in just 30 minutes.

Clad in a striking red and black outfit, the Malaysian player was a picture of concentration and determination as she took to the court. She stamped her authority on the game early on and raced into a 3–0 lead. She made good use of the court to stretch that advantage to 5–0. Try as she might, Chiu had no answer to Davis's incessant pressure and the opening game ended with a 9–0 whitewash in just six minutes.

David began the second game in similar fashion, winning the first point by varying her pace. Chiu finally broke the ice with a powerful shot to the right-hand corner of the court. But David was soon on top again and, after a series of long rallies, she stretched her lead to 4–1, before wrapping up the second game, 9–3.

In the third, the world No 1 raced into a 3–0 lead. Chiu managed to win a few points after an impressive array of shots and evened the score at 3-3. But David returned with a series of clinical executions to confirm her status as the Asian Games' top player and seal the match with a 9–3 score in the final game. Her gold was the 200th for Malaysia in Asian Games history.

After the game, David was keen to play down any talk of revenge, she said, “There is no thought of revenge. It is more about wanting to win that medal. She is a hard player to play and I had to keep her out of her comfort zone.

Individual

Swimming

Men

Women

Synchronized swimming

Triathlon

Volleyball

Beach volleyball
Men

Women

Weightlifting

Men

Wushu

In women's Taijiquan - two events combined, Malaysian girls won both gold and bronze.

Chai Fong Ying of Malaysia has won the first wushu medal of Doha 2006 by securing the women's taijiquan two events combined crown. This is also the sixth gold of Malaysia in this game.

The World No.1 was a convincing winner, coming out on top in both the taijiquan (shadow boxing) and taijijian (taiji sword) disciplines to win with a score of 19.38.

Taolu

References

Nations at the 2006 Asian Games
2006
Asian Games